Rutt is a both a given name and surname. As a given name, it is most commonly found in Estonia and is a feminine name, a cognate of Ruth, with the name day being 4 January.

Notable people with the surname include:
 Bevan Rutt (1916–1988), Australian architect and philanthropist
 Chris L. Rutt (1859–1936), American journalist and newspaper editor
 John Towill Rutt (1760–1841), English social reformer
 Richard Rutt (1925–2011), English Anglican missionary and Roman Catholic priest
 Nanny Rutt, a fictional character
 Rutt, a character from Disney's Brother Bear

Notable people with the given name include:
 (birn 1946), Estonian literary scholar and critic
Rutt Šmigun (born 1954), Estonian cross-country skier

References

Feminine given names
Estonian feminine given names